The Detroit Music Awards Foundation is a Michigan 501(c)(3) organization, whose mission is to recognize Detroit area musicians working on a national, regional, and local level. The Foundation supports and nurtures the musical community in Detroit and the Detroit metropolitan area to create a network for musicians that cuts across genres and styles.

Initially proposed in 1988, and first presented by the Motor City Music Foundation, the multi-genre awards ceremony was established to bring recognition to Detroit area musicians. The first awards show was held at the Detroit Music Hall, and later moved to the State Theatre, now called The Fillmore Detroit. In 1998, the organization merged with the Metro Times-sponsored Detroit Music Awards to become one organization with one awards show for the Detroit Music community.

Since its inception, the Detroit Music Awards has celebrated Detroit's vibrant music scene, including some of Detroit's most notable artists; including Alice Cooper, Anita Baker, Aretha Franklin, The Belleville Three, Big Sean, Bob Seger, CeCe Winans, The Clark Sisters, The Detroit Cobras, Diana Ross, Eminem, The Four Tops, George Clinton, Glenn Frey, The Gories, Grand Funk Railroad, Greta Van Fleet, Iggy Pop, Insane Clown Posse, Jack White, Kid Rock, Laith Al-Saadi, Luis Resto, Madonna, Martha Reeves and the Vandellas, Marvin Gaye, MC5, Mike Posner, The Miracles, Mitch Ryder, Parliament-Funkadelic, The Raconteurs, The Romantics, Royce da 5'9", Sixto Rodriguez, Smokey Robinson, The Spinners, Sponge, Stevie Wonder, The Stooges, The Supremes, Suzi Quatro, Takashi Iio, Ted Nugent, The Temptations, Thornetta Davis, Uncle Kracker, The Verve Pipe, The Von Bondies, Was (Not Was) and The White Stripes.

Categories
Award winners are selected by music industry professionals, with award categories covering the following genres:
 Americana/Folk/Acoustic
 Blues
 Jazz
 Gospel
 Country
 Classical
 Rock/Pop
 R&B/Hip-Hop
 Electronic
 World

Awards

General

Outstanding Anthology/Compilation/Reissue

Winners and nominees
Winners are listed first and highlighted in bold.

Outstanding Live Performance

Winners and nominees
Winners are listed first and highlighted in bold.

Outstanding Live Sound Technician

Winners and nominees
Winners are listed first and highlighted in bold.

Outstanding Local Record Label

Winners and nominees
Winners are listed first and highlighted in bold.

Outstanding National Major Record Label Recording

Winners and nominees
Winners are listed first and highlighted in bold.

Outstanding National Single

Winners and nominees
Winners are listed first and highlighted in bold.

Outstanding National Small/Independent Record Label Recording

Winners and nominees
Winners are listed first and highlighted in bold.

Outstanding Record Producer

Winners and nominees
Winners are listed first and highlighted in bold.

Outstanding Recording Studio

Winners and nominees
Winners are listed first and highlighted in bold.

Outstanding Video (Limited Budget)

Winners and nominees
Winners are listed first and highlighted in bold.

Outstanding Video (Major Budget)

Winners and nominees
Winners are listed first and highlighted in bold.

Outstanding Tribute Band

Winners and nominees
Winners are listed first and highlighted in bold.

Outstanding Family Music Artist/Group

Winners and nominees 
Winners are listed first and highlighted in bold.

Outstanding Family/Children's Music

Winners and nominees 
Winners are listed first and highlighted in bold.

Americana

Outstanding Americana/Acoustic/Folk/Group

Winners and nominees
Winners are listed first and highlighted in bold.

Outstanding Americana/Acoustic/Folk Instrumentalist

Winners and nominees
Winners are listed first and highlighted in bold.

Blues

Classical

Country

Electronic/Dance

Gospel

Jazz

Rock/Pop/Alternative

Urban/Funk/Hip Hop

Outstanding Hip-Hop Artist/Group

Winners 
Winners are listed first and highlighted in bold.

Outstanding Rap Artist or Group

Winners and nominees 
Winners are listed first and highlighted in bold.

Outstanding Hip-Hop DJ

Winners 
Winners are listed first and highlighted in bold.

Outstanding Rap Producer/DJ

Winners and nominees 
Winners are listed first and highlighted in bold.

Outstanding Rap Composer

Winners and nominees 
Winners are listed first and highlighted in bold.

Outstanding Hip-Hop MC

Winners 
Winners are listed first and highlighted in bold.

Outstanding Rap MC

Winners and nominees 
Winners are listed first and highlighted in bold.

Outstanding Rap Recording

Winners and nominees 
Winners are listed first and highlighted in bold.

References

External links
Detroit Music Awards website

American music awards
Blues music awards
Classical music awards
Country music awards
Folk music awards
Pop music awards
Rock music awards